Stanleya is a genus of freshwater snails, aquatic gastropod molluscs in the family Paludomidae. 

Rumella is the type genus of the tribe Rumellini.

Species 
Species in the genus Stanleya include:
 Stanleya neritinoides (E. A. Smith, 1880) (synonym: Rumella milneedwardsiana Bourguignat, 1885 )
Synonyms
 Stanleya giraudi: synonym of Stanleya neritinoides (E. A. Smith, 1880) (junior synonym)
 Stanleya rotundata E. A. Smith, 1904: synonym of Bridouxia rotundata (E. A. Smith, 1904) (original combination)
 Stanleya smithiana Bourguignat, 1885: synonym of Stanleya neritinoides (E. A. Smith, 1880) (junior synonym)

References 

 Strong, E. E.; Glaubrecht, M. (2003). Anatomy and systematic affinity of Stanleya neritinoides (Smith, 1880), an enigmatic member of the thalassoid gastropod species flock in Lake Tanganyika, East Africa (Cerithioidea, Paludomidae). Acta Zoologica. 84: 249–265.
 Bank, R. A. (2017). Classification of the Recent freshwater/brackish Gastropoda of the World. Last update: January 24th, 2018. OpenAccess publication.

External links
 Bourguignat, J.-R. (1885). Notice prodromique sur les mollusques terrestres et fluviatiles recueillis par M. Victor Giraud dans la région méridionale du lac Tanganyika. 110 pp. Paris

Paludomidae